Sexless Demons and Scars is the debut album by Jack Off Jill. At the time the group consisted of Jessicka, Agent Moulder, Ho Ho Spade, and Lauracet Simpson. Original members Michelle Inhell and Tenni Ah-Cha-Cha left the band a few months prior to the recording.

As of February 2000, the album has sold 13,282 copies, according to Nielsen SoundScan.

Track listing 

Note

 Tracks 14-98 are blank.

Personnel 
Credits are adapted from the album's liner notes.

Jack Off Jill
 Jessicka — vocals, cover artwork
 Robin "Agent" Moulder— bass, piano, cover artwork
 Ho Ho Spade — guitar
 Lauracet Simpson— drums
Additional musicians

 Marilyn Manson — guitar on "Swollen"

Production
Don Fleming — production, mixing
Bill Emmons — engineering
Christoper Sphar — assistant engineer
Doug Sax  — mastering

References 

Jack Off Jill albums
1997 debut albums
Riot grrrl albums
Alternative rock albums by American artists
Gothic rock albums by American artists